Sveti Vid may refer to several places in Slovenia: 

Šentvid pri Planini, a settlement in the Municipality of Šentjur, known as Sveti Vid pri Planini until 1955
Šentvid pri Zavodnju, a settlement in the Municipality of Šoštanj, known as Sveti Vid pri Zavodnju until 1955
Sveti Vid, Cerknica, a settlement in the Municipality of Cerknica
Sveti Vid, Vuzenica, a settlement in the Municipality of Vuzenica
Vidovica, a settlement in the Municipality of Podčetrtek, known as Sveti Vid until 1955